Agonochaetia terrestrella is a moth of the family Gelechiidae. It is found in Switzerland, Albania and Romania.

References

Moths described in 1872
Agonochaetia
Moths of Europe